Potiaete maculata is a species of beetle in the family Cerambycidae, the only species in the genus Potiaete.

References

Hesperophanini